Michael Witmore (born May 3, 1967) is a Shakespearean, scholar of rhetoric,  digital humanist, and director of a library and cultural institution. In 2011, he was appointed the director of the Folger Shakespeare Library in Washington, D.C., where he continues to serve.

Early life and career
Michael Witmore graduated from Vassar College in 1989 with a bachelor's degree in English. He has an M.A. and a Ph.D. in rhetoric from the University of California, Berkeley. From 1999 to 2008, he was an assistant professor and then an associate professor of English at Carnegie Mellon University. From 2008 to 2011, he was a professor of English at the University of Wisconsin–Madison.

Witmore's books include Culture of Accidents: Unexpected Knowledges in Early Modern England (2001), the co-winner of the 2003 Perkins Prize for the study of narrative literature; Pretty Creatures: Children and Fiction in the English Renaissance (2007); Shakespearean Metaphysics (2008); and Landscapes of the Passing Strange: Reflections from Shakespeare (2010) with photographer Rosamond Purcell. He was the co-curator with Purcell of the 2012 Folger exhibition "Very Like a Whale", based on Landscapes of the Passing Strange. He co-edited Childhood and Children's Books in Early Modern Europe, 1550–1800 (2006) and Shakespeare and Early Modern Religion (2015).

Digital humanities

A pioneer in the use of computers for digital analysis of the texts of William Shakespeare, Witmore launched and directed the Working Group for Digital Inquiry at the University of Wisconsin-Madison and organized the Pittsburgh Consortium for Medieval and Renaissance Studies.

He also founded Wine Dark Sea, a blog on the nature of linguistic variation in Shakespeare's plays and early modern English text; he continues to jointly maintain the blog with Jonathan Hope of  Strathclyde University. Witmore and Hope are collaborating on a book in progress, Shakespeare by the Numbers and Other Tales from the Digital Frontier.

Witmore is interested in how the resources of computing, when applied to collections of digitized texts, can allow scholars to do intellectual and cultural history "at the level of the sentence". He is known for proposing that "massive addressability" is a fundamental feature of texts.

Folger Shakespeare Library
As the director of the Folger Shakespeare Library, Witmore developed a new strategic plan, which was accepted by the board in 2013.

During Witmore's tenure, the Folger has pursued multiple digital humanities (DH) projects, including Early Modern Manuscripts Online (EMMO), Shakespeare's World (a crowdsourced manuscripts project), Shakespeare Documented, free and searchable Folger Digital Texts of Shakespeare's plays and poems, A Digital Anthology of Early Modern English Drama, and apps with a social reading platform for seven of Shakespeare's most-known plays.

Witmore led the Folger in celebrating two major anniversaries: the 450th anniversary of Shakespeare's birth in 2014 and the 400th anniversary of Shakespeare's death in 2016. In preparation for both events, the library updated and renovated its Great Hall exhibition space and completed a number of upgrades to its Elizabethan Theatre. For the 2016 anniversary, the Folger organized the First Folio! The Book That Gave Us Shakespeare tour, displaying First Folios from the Folger collection in all 50 states, Washington, DC, and Puerto Rico, with public programs and events at the host sites.

Other aspects of the 2016 anniversary celebration included a C-SPAN2 Book TV live broadcast on the anniversary date, a Los Angeles exhibition on America's Shakespeare: The Bard Goes West, launching a continuing Theater Partnership Program nationwide, commissioning the vocal work "The Isle" (based on The Tempest) by Caroline Shaw, premiering District Merchants, a variation of The Merchant of Venice set in Washington, D.C., after the Civil War, and piloting the CrossTalk DC community discussion program on race and religion as part of the NEH’s Humanities in the Public Square program.

Under Witmore, the Folger also produced Manifold Greatness: The Creation and Afterlife of the King James Bible, an NEH-funded 2011–13 national touring panel exhibition on the 400th anniversary of the 1611 King James Bible, with the Bodleian Library of the University of Oxford; the free Shakespeare Unlimited podcast series; the Folger Shakespeare Audio Editions, studio recordings of seven Shakespeare plays by the Folger Theatre; Experiencing Shakespeare, an electronic field trip used by hundreds of thousands of students, which won two regional Emmys; and the general-audience Shakespeare & Beyond blog.

References

Further reading
 "Q&A with Michael Witmore", April 29, 2015, C-SPAN.
"Michael Witmore", Folgerpedia, Folger Shakespeare Library.
"Q & A: Michael Witmore, Director", The Collation blog, September 12, 2011. Folger Shakespeare Library.
Trescott, Jacqueline. "An interview with Michael Witmore", The Washington Post, September 30, 2011.
Trescott, Jacqueline. "Michael Witmore named director of Folger Shakespeare Library", The Washington Post, April 7, 2011.

External links
Folger Shakespeare Library
Wine Dark Sea blog

1967 births
American rhetoricians
People in digital humanities
Folger Shakespeare Library
Living people
Shakespearean scholars
University of California, Berkeley alumni
University of Wisconsin–Madison faculty
Vassar College alumni